Kari Tolvanen (13 December 1916 – 1 March 1993) was a Finnish equestrian. He competed in two events at the 1956 Summer Olympics.

References

External links
 

1916 births
1993 deaths
Finnish male equestrians
Olympic equestrians of Finland
Equestrians at the 1956 Summer Olympics
Sportspeople from North Ostrobothnia